The Zschonerbach  is a small river of Saxony, Germany. It flows into the Elbe near Dresden.

See also
List of rivers of Saxony

Rivers of Saxony
Rivers of Germany